Oscar Bonini (born 13 July 1959) is an Argentine rower. He competed in the men's quadruple sculls event at the 1984 Summer Olympics.

References

1959 births
Living people
Argentine male rowers
Olympic rowers of Argentina
Rowers at the 1984 Summer Olympics
Place of birth missing (living people)